The men's épée was one of eight fencing events on the fencing at the 1976 Summer Olympics programme. It was the seventeenth appearance of the event. The competition was held from July 22 to 23 1976. 64 fencers from 26 nations competed. Each nation was limited to 3 fencers. The event came down to a three-way barrage among the medalists, with two West German fencers joining Győző Kulcsár of Hungary (who had previously won gold in 1968 and bronze in 1972) in this tie-breaker fencing session. Alexander Pusch won against both opponents in the barrage to take gold, with Hans-Jürgen Hehn defeating Kulcsár for silver. The medals were the first for West Germany in the men's individual épée. Kulcsár's bronze made him the second man to earn three medals in the event (Edoardo Mangiarotti in 1948–1956, also with a gold and two bronzes, was the first).

Background

This was the 17th appearance of the event, which was not held at the first Games in 1896 (with only foil and sabre events held) but has been held at every Summer Olympics since 1900.

Five of the six finalists (including the three medalists) from the 1972 Games returned: gold medalist Csaba Fenyvesi of Hungary, silver medalist Jacques Ladègaillerie of France, bronze medalist (and 1968 gold medalist) Győző Kulcsár of Hungary, fourth-place finisher Anton Pongratz of Romania, and fifth-place finisher Rolf Edling of Sweden. The previous four years had seen the rise of Sweden and West Germany in the event; Edling had won the 1973 and 1974 World Championships; Alexander Pusch of West Germany was the reigning (1975) World Champion.

Thailand made its debut in the event. The United States appeared for the 16th time, most among nations, having missed only the 1908 edition of the event.

Competition format

The 1976 tournament returned to a mix of pool and knockout rounds similar to that used in 1968, after the 1972 edition briefly used a pool-only format. The competition included three pool rounds, followed by a double-elimination knockout round, finishing with a final pool round. In each pool round, the fencers competed in a round-robin.

Bouts in the round-robin pools were to 5 touches; bouts in the double-elimination round were to 10 touches. Repechages were not used in the first three rounds, but were used to determine medalists if necessary in the final.

 Round 1: 12 pools of 5 or 6 fencers each. The top 3 in each pool (36 total) advanced.
 Round 2: 6 pools of 6 fencers each. The top 4 in each pool (24 total) advanced.
 Round 3: 4 pools of 6 fencers each. The top 4 in each pool (16 total) advanced.
 Elimination rounds: A double-elimination tournament. The 4 fencers who won in both of the first two rounds advanced, as did the 2 fencers who reached the end of the repechage.
 Final round: 1 pool of 6 fencers.

Schedule

All times are Eastern Daylight Time (UTC-4)

Results

Round 1

Round 1 Pool A

Round 1 Pool B

Round 1 Pool C

Round 1 Pool D

Round 1 Pool E

Round 1 Pool F

Round 1 Pool G

Round 1 Pool H

Round 1 Pool I

Round 1 Pool J

Round 1 Pool K

Round 1 Pool L

Round 2

Round 2 Pool A

Round 2 Pool B

Round 2 Pool C

Round 2 Pool D

Round 2 Pool E

Round 2 Pool F

Round 3

Round 3 Pool A

Round 3 Pool B

Round 3 Pool C

Round 3 Pool D

Double elimination rounds

Winners brackets

Winners group 1

Winners group 2

Winners group 3

Winners group 4

Losers brackets

Losers group 1

Losers group 2

Final round 

The final pool was closely fought, with all six fencers at either 3–2 or 2–3. The three men who finished with three wins advanced to a barrage to determine the medals, while the three men who had only two wins in the pool were ranked by pool results. In the barrage, Pusch defeated both Kulcsár and Hehn to win the gold medal, with Hehn prevailing over Kulcsár to take silver.

 Barrage

Final classification

References

Epee men
Men's events at the 1976 Summer Olympics